Hovhannes Babakhanyan (born December 1, 1968) is an Armenian-American actor and singer. He received the title Honored Actor of Armenia 2006 in Yerevan, Armenia

Biography 
Hovhannes Babakhanyan was born in Yerevan, Armenia. He is the fourth child in the family of Gerasim Babakhnyan and Tamara Gevorgyan. His father was a talented actor and musician and his mother was a singer.

Babakhanyan graduated from Siamanto High School. He studied Theater Art, with grand masters such as H. Ghaplanyan, Z.Tatincyan, Armen Khandikyan and many others. Later he started to learn Classical singing, as a baritone, in Rafael Akopyanc class. He worked at Yerevan State Drama Theater named after Hrachya Ghaplanyan Drama Theatre as an actor, where he met his wife, an actress Mari Msryan and got married in 1993. They have three children, Lia Babakhanyan, Ella Babakhanyan, Gor Leo Babakhanyan.

Now Babakhanyan lives in California with his family. In 2006 he went on tour to Lebanon, Iran, London, New York City, Poland, Czech Republic, Hungary, Russia, Belarus, Georgian Republic where he performed "Contrabass" as a solo performance and was honored with the high appraisal and warm applause of the audience.

Hovhannes Babkhanyan has played many roles in theater.

Theater 
"The Commandment"Mono-Play, based on the essays of Karen Khachatrian (Khachkar)
"Those charming lips"(Arthur)
"Who Are You Lord" Jesus Christ
"The Bus" (Virtuoso, Young man)
"Romeo and Juliet" (Mercutio, Benvoleo, Father Lorenco)
"Julius Caesar" (Anthonios, Lucios)
"Jesus from Nazareth and his Second Pupil" (Apostle Peter)
"Hello Scoundrel" (Man A)
"To Kill for Love"(Bruno Manchini)
"Respected Beggars" (poet, actor)
"Top Hat" (Rudolphio)
"Tract about a Handkerchief" (Othello)
"Sonnet for violoncello" (man)
"Macbeth" (Macduph)
"One More Jackson" (Bob Jackson)
"Contrabass" (contrabassist) 
"I and I" (musician)
"Sonnet for the Cello" (Man)
"Neutral Zone" (Abel Arcatbanyan)
"Mama-Mia" (Tito Merely)
"Beatriche" (Lukas)
"Love and Laughter" (Doktor Shavarsh, Eduard, Panjuni)
"Endless Return" (Judge, The boy, Citizen)
"Tremendous Silence" (Vahram Papazyan, Prison Guard)
"Colonel Bird" (Doctor)
"Hello Out There"(A Young Man)
"The Eastern Dentist" (Levon)
"Premier" (Irakly)
"My Heart is in The Highland"  (Ben Alexander)
"My Black Heart, and your White Angel" (Gregor)
"Filumena Marturano" (Mikele)
"Richard III" (James Tyrrell)
"Your Last Harbors" (Vahagn, Avetis),
"Slow Down Earth" (Judge)
"Cobweb"(Dail Korban)
"The Government Inspector" (Khlestakov)
"Stand, Court is In Order" (Adolpf Fon gordon)
"Woman and a Man" (Director)
"The Child From the Yard" (Mayis)
"Msye Amilcar" (Polo)
"Urinetown" The Musical (Officer Barrel) by Jeanette D. Farr
"We Are Stardust" (Giordano Bruno) by Melissa R. Randel
and many others

Film and TV 

'Nert Shel Sabbat" by:Lital Mizrahi (head Russian Guard)
"OHTWO" - Obvious Ways by:Nahuel Vilar and chris Vinan. (Businessman)
"Four Of A Kind" by;Gaoyang Ganjin (Diamond)
"Karaganda" by: Max Weissberg (Armenian Cook)
"Elisa's Almost Thirty" by: Raquel Gardner And (Liquor Store Employee) 
"Crossing Roads" by: Ruben Kochar (Hovhannes Tumanyan)(Komitas Vardapet)
"Cagliostro" by; Ruben Kochar (Graf Cagliostro)
"Hi-Show"  Hovhannes' International Show on AMGA-TV(Armenian Media Group Of America)TV-Canal
"The Poet,Sayat Nova"  (Director,producer)(Sayat Nova)The Poet, Sayat Nova (Short) (announced)
Sayat Nova
"SWAT"  TV Show on CBS (Arpad)
"Auto-Portrait"  by Ruben Kochar (Thesmos)(Jesus)
"Veep"TV-Showlk, on HBO (Princ Hamad Al Gani)
"Metamorphoses" by Ruben Kochar (Jesus Christ)(Chris Davidson)
"Herostratus"  by Ruben Kochar starring the role of Herostratus
"Metamorphoses" (Cries Davidson) by Ruben Kochar
"Symphony of Silence"  (Gumreci), by Vigen,
"The Priestess"  (Teo) by Vigen  Chaldranyan
"Common Instingt" by Arsen Arakelyan(Son)
"Monologue" by Ashot Gevorgyan (Artist)
"The Slaves of Destiny"by Diana Grigoryan(Nikol Areyan)
East of Byzantium by Roger Kupelian(Shah Shapur0

"Antropolopy" (Hovik) by Ashot Gevorgyan
"The wall" (Khuan) by Zohrap Papoyan
"A Street Car Named Desire " (Harold Mitch)  by T. Bityustskaya-Elibekyan
Music video  by Armen Vatyan
Music Video by Asot Gevorgyan
"My Door is Open"(poet) by Zara Sargsyan-Kasparyants
"Lovember" (Voland) by Tigran Khzmalyan
"Slaves of Destiny" (Nicol Arean) by Diana Grigoryan
"Chain" (Levon) By Ruben Kochar
"The Wall" Jean Paul Sartre by Zohrab Papoyan
"Love or Laughs" (Armenian Mafia) by Romane Simon
"Life of Gia" (Father Priestol) by Romane Simon
"Avto Rob" by Herbert Gasparyan (Bubo)
"Tigranes The Great" by Aren Vatyan (King Tigran)
"Big Story In a Small Gity" by Gor Kirakosian (Best Man)
"Can't Live Without Love" by Ashot Gevorgyan (Husband)
"Vedi Alco" by Ashot Gevorgyan (Man)
"Samsung mart TV" (Arab Sheikh) Commercial
"Newcastle Vikings Amber Ale" (Brian) Commercial
"Captain Morgan" (Pirate) Commercial
"Captain Morgan" (Glass Eye) Commercial
"Fake News" (Douglas Albright)

Awards 
 "Humanitarian Award from United Nations Association 2022
 "Best International Actor" from: Art for Peace. 
 "BEST AMERICAN ARMENIAN ACTOR of 2022",from AMTWA awards.
 "Arts Four Peace" Awards 2018 for "Best International Actor" from Munni Irone
 "Vladimir Vernadski" Golden medal from the American Branch of the Russian Academy of the Natural Sciences To HOVHANNES BABAKHANYAN For outstanding achievements and significant contribution in creating the enlightened society and contribution to the Art."
 "Woodrow Wilson" Gold Medal of the First Degree, presented by Founder President of National Academy of Science, Suren Ghazaryan
 "Certificate of Recognition" Presented to Hovhannes Babakhanyan from US congressman Adam Schiff.
 "Certificate of Recognition" from Consulate General of The Republic of Armenia
 "Certificate Of Recognition" from California State Senate.
 "Certificate Of Recognition" from Assembly member Laura Friedman.
 "Certificate Of Recognition" from Glendale City mayor, Vardan Garpetian.
 "Golden Medal" From the Union of Theatrical Members of Armenia
 "Laureate Of The International Theatre" in festival  "Theatr Teritorie Yedeneniya" in Vladimir, Russia.
In 2002 the actor was nominated with "Artavazd Prize" by the Union of Art Workers of Armenia.
 In 2004 the play by P. Ziuskind "Contrabass" won the "Main Prize of the Council of Directors"
 "Best Skilled actor Prize" at the Armmono International Festival.
 6th Moscow Monotheatre Festival he won "Main Prize of the Council of Directors".
 In 2005 he took part in the "Vidlunia" Festival in Kiev and won 3 prizes: "The best Actor"," The sympathy of the audience" and "Diploma of an Honorary Participant", which was among 26 countries where only 4 countries won.
 "The Best Ethnic Hero" in the movie "The Priestess" in film festival"Listopad" (Minsk, Belarus 2008).
 On March 27, 2006 on the occasion of International Theater Day Hovhannes was awarded the title of
 "Honored Actor of the Republic of Armenia" by the president of the country.

California
 "Ambassador of National Culture" medal from Armenia's Ministry of Diaspora through minister Hranush Hakobyan
 "Appreciation Award" from Mike Gatto, member of California State Assembly Mike Gatto.
 "Appreciation Award" from Member of the U.S. House of Representatives Adam Schiff.
 "Lifetime Achievement Award" from the Hollywood Chamber of Commerce.
 "Special Award" From designer Eugene Melvin Sidney.

Personal life
Babakhanyan is married to actress Mari Msryan. The couple have two daughters Lia Babakhanayn, Ella Babakhanyan and a son Gor Leo Babakhanyan.

References

External links   https://www.iravunk.com/?p=241534&l=am&fbclid=IwAR16SnYXBfmGfn0E4z1Wxq9vYbZHKCX6k8Kax1kwDpXt5hPE8BrcuClBP3w
Clients - Victor Kruglov & Associates
http://www.7500magazine.com/triple-threat.html

1968 births
Living people
Armenian male film actors
Armenian male stage actors
21st-century Armenian male singers
Male actors from Yerevan
Musicians from Yerevan
21st-century Armenian male actors
20th-century Armenian male singers